Microsoft Operations Framework (MOF) 4.0 is a series of guides aimed at helping information technology (IT) professionals establish and implement reliable, cost-effective services.

Overview 

MOF 4.0 was created to provide guidance across the entire IT life cycle. Completed in early 2008, MOF 4.0 integrates community-generated processes; governance, risk, and compliance activities; management reviews, and Microsoft Solutions Framework (MSF) best practices.  

The guidance in the Microsoft Operations Framework encompasses all of the activities and processes involved in managing an IT service: its conception, development, operation, maintenance, and—ultimately—its retirement.

Structure of MOF 4.0 

MOF 4.0 The Plan Phase focuses on ensuring that, from its inception, a requested IT service is reliable, policy-compliant, cost-effective, and adaptable to changing business needs.

The Deliver Phase concerns the envisioning, planning, building, stabilization, and deployment of requested services.

The Operate Phase deals with the efficient operation, monitoring, and support of deployed services in line with agreed-to service level agreement (SLA) targets.

The Manage Layer helps users establish an integrated approach to IT service management activities through the use of risk management, change management, and controls. It also provides guidance relating to accountabilities and role types.

Service Management Functions

MOF organizes IT activities and processes into Service Management Functions (SMFs) which provide operational guidance for capabilities within the service management environment. Each SMF is anchored within a related lifecycle phase and contains a unique set of goals and outcomes supporting the objectives of that phase. 

Management Reviews

An IT service’s readiness to move from one phase to the next is confirmed by management reviews, which ensure that goals are achieved in an appropriate fashion and that IT’s goals are aligned with the goals of the organization. 

Governance, Risk, and Compliance

The interrelated disciplines of governance, risk, and compliance (GRC) represent a cornerstone of MOF 4.0. 
IT governance is a senior management–level activity that clarifies who holds the authority to make decisions, determines accountability for actions and responsibility for outcomes, and addresses how expected performance will be evaluated. 
Risk represents possible adverse impacts on reaching goals and can arise from actions taken or not taken. 
Compliance is a process that ensures individuals are aware of regulations, policies, and procedures that must be followed as a result of senior management’s decisions.

See also 
IT Service Management
ITIL
IT Service Management Forum (ITSMF)
Microsoft's infrastructure optimization

External links 
 Microsoft Operations Framework 4.0 homepage
 Microsoft Solution Accelerators
 Microsoft Operations Framework Brazil Project
 Cross-reference MOF v4 versus ITIL v3

Microsoft initiatives
Information technology management